Stripped is a 2018 Israeli drama film, the first in the Love Trilogy, written and directed by Yaron Shani. The film premiered at the Venice Film Festival. The second part of the trilogy, Chained, came out in January 2019.

Plot summary 
Alice Turgeman (Laliv Sivan) is a writer whose first book was a huge success. She is a rising star in Israel's literary world, but she experiences a mental breakdown because of unceasing visions of being raped and abused. Ziv Zuckerman (Bar Gottfried) is an introverted high-school student who plays classical guitar, and is trying to achieve musician status for his compulsory military service. The encounter between the two illustrates how crises can catalyze destruction as well as growth, violence as well as grace.

Cast of characters 
Shani works with non-actors, who receive no script but rather improvise the scenes on camera. Shooting was done in single takes, without rehearsals.

Production 
The film is a German-Israeli co-production, produced by Naomi Levari and Saar Yogev of Black Sheep Productions, in collaboration with Michael Rotter of The Post Republic Company. The film was supported by the Israel Film Fund, ARTE, and Yes television. It is distributed by Alpha Violet, and independent film distributor based in France.

Awards

See also 
 Love Trilogy: Chained

References

External links 

 
 
 

2010s Hebrew-language films
Israeli drama films
2018 films
2018 romantic drama films